An election to Westmeath County Council took place on 23 May 2014 as part of that year's Irish local elections. 20 councillors were elected from three electoral divisions by PR-STV voting for a five-year term of office, a reduction of 3 seats compared to 2009. In addition Athlone Town Council and Mullingar Town Council were both abolished.

Fianna Fáil emerged as the largest party after the elections as both Government parties suffered at the polls. Labour lost 2 thirds of their Councillors being reduced to just 2 seats while Fine Gael also lost 3 seats. Sinn Féin won seats on the Council for the first time, 3 in total, and were joined by 2 Independents.

Results by party

Results by Electoral Area

Athlone

Mullingar-Coole

Mullingar-Kilbeggan

References

Changes since 2014
† Athlone Independent Cllr Kevin (Boxer) Moran was elected as a TD for Longford-Westmeath at the Irish general election, 2016. Ailish McManus was co-opted to fill the vacancy on 21 March 2016.
†† Mullingar-Coole Fine Gael Cllr Peter Burke was elected as TD for Longford-Westmeath at the Irish general election, 2016. Emily Wallace was co-opted to fill the vacancy on 21 March 2016.
††† Mullingar-Coole Fianna Fáil Cllr Aidan Davitt was elected to Seanad Éireann in April 2016. Bill Collentine was co-opted to fill the vacancy on 13 June 2016.
†††† Mullingar-Kilbeggan Fianna Fáil Cllr Paul Daly was elected to Seanad Éireann in April 2016. Liam McDaniel was co-opted to fill the vacancy on 13 June 2016.
††††† Mullingar-Kilbeggan Fianna Fáil Cllr Avril Whitney resigned her seat for personal reasons on 31 May 2017. In September 2017 Brian Crum was co-opted to fill the vacancy. 
†††††† Athlone Sinn Féin Cllr Paul Hogan resigned from the party and became an Independent on 30 July 2018 saying the party had isolated and ostracised him since October 2015.
††††††† Mullingar-Coole Sinn Féin Cllr Una D'Arcy resigned from the party and became an Independent on 22 January 2019 saying that she didn't have the support she needed and that she didn't align with its views.

External links
 Official website

2014 Irish local elections
2014